The 9th European Badminton Championships were held in Preston, England, between 8  and 14 April 1984, and hosted by the European Badminton Union and Badminton England.

Venue 
The championships were held at the Guild Hall.

Medalists

Results

Semi-finals

Finals

Medal account

References 

European Badminton Championships
European Badminton Championships
B
Badminton tournaments in England
Sport in Preston
1980s in Lancashire
International sports competitions hosted by England